Dundee Ice Arena is a multi-purpose ice rink arena located in the Camperdown area of Dundee. The arena has a capacity of 2,400 seats making it the fourth largest ice rink arena by capacity in Scotland after the Braehead Arena, Murrayfield Ice Rink and the Fife Ice Arena.  

It hosts a number of events such as Dundee Stars home hockey games and figure skating competitions and is also the host venue for the 7th WUKF World Karate Championships which will be the first of its kind to be held in Scotland.

History 
The Dundee Ice Arena was built in 2000 at a cost of £6.6 million and has running costs of approximately £400,000 per year. 

The Dundee Ice Arena opened allowing the Dundee Tigers SNL team to return to home ice after a decade of nomadic existence. The Tigers won the Scottish National League in the 2000/01 season in front of crowds regularly exceeding 1200 spectators.

Dundee Stars 

For the 2001/02 season, the Dundee Stars ice hockey club was formed, making the ice arena their home venue. The Stars played initially in the British National League, 2001 - 2005, before competing in the SNL and Northern League for 5 seasons. Before stepping up to compete in the top professional league in the UK, the Elite Ice Hockey League (EIHL) since the 2010/11 season. The Stars were formed in August 2001 and will celebrate their 20th Anniversary season, once the puck drops in September 2021.

The Dundee Stars regularly host crowds in excess of 1500 and most recently hosted the Fife Flyers on 22/2/20, for the first sell out (2400) at Dundee Ice Arena in the EIHL era.

Ice Dundee 

Dundee Ice Arena is home to Ice Dundee, a fantastic group with some of the best figure skaters in the UK, who regularly compete for GB and Ireland at European and World Championships. They are coached by Simon Briggs and Debi Briggs

British Ladies number one and four time British Ladies Champion Natasha McKay currently trains at DIA, alongside British Ladies Number two Karly Robertson and British Ladies number three Danielle Harrison

World Karate Championships 2018 
In 2018, the Dundee Ice Arena was the host venue of the 7th WUKF World Karate Championships, the largest sporting event to be held in Dundee as well as being the first city in Scotland to host the event. During the championships, the ice rink was converted into a platform which was used for the karate events, the ice arena therefore was temporary closed to let the conversion work begin.

References

External links 

Sports venues in Dundee
Indoor ice hockey venues in Scotland
Sports venues completed in 2000
Curling venues in Scotland